The Dartmouth Bridge is a steel girder bridge that spans the Mississippi River in Minneapolis between the Cedar-Riverside area and the University of Minnesota campus area. It carries I-94/US 12/US 52. It was built in 1964 and was designed by Parsons Brinckerhoff, Quade and Douglas. It is named for its proximity to Dartmouth Avenue SE, just north of the bridge.

The original span was an uninspired girder bridge design when compared to other Mississippi River bridges in the vicinity. However, the bridge carries more vehicles than any other bridge in the state (167,000 vehicles daily), on Interstate 94 between downtown Minneapolis and Saint Paul.

The original span was completely demolished and rebuilt in the mid-1990s.  The current span uses a steel I-beam construction supported by two bridge piers.  Prior to August 2007, the bridge carried four lanes of traffic in each direction.  One of these lanes on each side is used for an entrance/exit lane for Huron Boulevard (East Bank) and Riverside Avenue (West Bank).  Following the I-35W Mississippi River bridge collapse, through traffic was detoured along a  stretch of I-94 including this bridge before turning north on Minnesota State Highway 280.  To support the extra traffic volume, the deck surface was repainted to temporarily carry five lanes in each direction including the auxiliary lanes.  Due to favorable response, the additional lane was made permanent and currently remains in use.

See also

List of crossings of the Upper Mississippi River

References

 

Bridges in Minneapolis
Bridges over the Mississippi River
Bridges completed in 1964
Interstate 94
Bridges on the Interstate Highway System
Road bridges in Minnesota
Box girder bridges
Mississippi Gorge
U.S. Route 12
U.S. Route 52
Bridges of the United States Numbered Highway System
Steel bridges in the United States